Order of Education and Pedagogy is one of the badges of honor in Iran, established by " The Council of Iran Ministers" on November 21, 1990. According to "Article 16" of the "Regulations on the Awarding of Government Orders" of Iran, the "Order of Education and Pedagogy" due to emphasizes the importance of learning science and the necessity of transferring Islamic education in society, awarded to persons who have demonstrated competence in the following fields:

 Development and transfer of science, technology, and profession
 Designing and implementing innovative and successful ways of teaching and nurturing
 An impressive and successful endeavor to make trainees polite and ethical in Islamic rituals and social desirable ethics

Recipients

Types
The "Order of Education and Pedagogy" has three types of medal:

See also
 Order of Freedom (Iran)
 Order of Altruism
 Order of Work and Production
 Order of Research
 Order of Mehr
 Order of Justice (Iran)
 Order of Construction
 Order of Knowledge
 Order of Persian Politeness
 Order of Independence (Iran)
 Order of Service
 Order of Courage (Iran)
 Order of Culture and Art
 Order of Merit and Management
 Order of Fath
 Order of Islamic Republic
 Order of Nasr

References

External links
 Orders of Iran Regulations in diagrams
 Orders of Iran in diagrams
 Types of Iran's badges and their material benefits

CS1 uses Persian-language script (fa)
Awards established in 1990
Civil awards and decorations of Iran
1990 establishments in Iran